Law Chun Yan (born 21 June 1994) is a former Hong Kong professional footballer who played as a midfielder.

References

External links
HKFA

1994 births
Living people
Hong Kong footballers
Association football midfielders
South China AA players
Tai Po FC players
Hong Kong Rangers FC players
Lee Man FC players
Resources Capital FC players
Hong Kong Premier League players
Hong Kong First Division League players